Our Lady of Guadaloupe Church is a historic church at 302 S. Kendrick in Flagstaff, Arizona, United States. It was built in 1926 and added to the National Register of Historic Places in 1986.

References

Churches in Coconino County, Arizona
Gothic Revival church buildings in Arizona
Churches on the National Register of Historic Places in Arizona
Roman Catholic churches completed in 1926
Roman Catholic churches in Arizona
National Register of Historic Places in Flagstaff, Arizona
20th-century Roman Catholic church buildings in the United States